Sason is a genus of bark-dwelling brushed trapdoor spiders first described by Eugène Simon in 1887. It is distributed from the Seychelles through India to northern Australia. The closest related genus seems to be the monotypic Paracenobiopelma.

Description
They are strongly patterned and have stout legs, physically resembling those of the tree trapdoor spiders.

Distribution
Most species are endemic small areas, many of which are small islands that emerged from the ocean floor in recent geological times with no connection to the mainland. These were likely inhabited by pregnant females surviving in floating logs, while most of the other speciation is believed to have occurred due to fragmentation of the former supercontinent Gondwana.

Taxonomy
The genus was erected by Octavius Pickard-Cambridge in 1883 for the type species Sarpedon robustum, but this name was already in use for a genus of false click beetles. In 1887, Eugène Simon renamed the genus to Sason, an abbreviation of the biblical judge Samson. The earlier name was based on Sarpedon, a legendary king at the siege of Troy, alluding to their "regal" appearance.

Species
 it contains nine species:
Sason andamanicum (Simon, 1888) – India (Andaman Is.)
Sason colemani Raven, 1986 – Australia (Queensland)
Sason hirsutum Schwendinger, 2003 – Indonesia
Sason maculatum (Roewer, 1963) – Mariana Is., Caroline Is.
Sason pectinatum Kulczyński, 1908 – New Guinea
Sason rameshwaram Siliwal & Molur, 2009 – India
Sason robustum (O. Pickard-Cambridge, 1883) (type) – India, Sri Lanka, Seychelles
Sason sechellanum Simon, 1898 – Seychelles
Sason sundaicum Schwendinger, 2003 – Thailand, Malaysia

References

Sason
Sason
Spiders of Africa
Spiders of Asia
Spiders of Oceania
Taxa named by Eugène Simon